Anon San-Mhard (Thai อานนท์ สันหมาด; born July 3, 1991) is a Thai footballer who plays for Krabi in Thai League 2. He is a former left winger.

Honours

International
U-23
 BIDC Cup 2013 ; Winner

External links
 
 

1991 births
Living people
Anon San-Mhard
Anon San-Mhard
Anon San-Mhard
Anon San-Mhard
Anon San-Mhard
Anon San-Mhard
Association football wingers
Anon San-Mhard